is a retired Japanese swimmer. She had just turned 13 when she qualified for the 1968 Olympics, where she competed in the 100 m and 200 m breaststroke. At her next Olympics in 1972 she took part in the 4 × 100 m freestyle and 200 m and 400 m medley events, but was also eliminated in the preliminaries.

References

1955 births
Living people
Japanese female breaststroke swimmers
Japanese female butterfly swimmers
Japanese female medley swimmers
Japanese female freestyle swimmers
Swimmers at the 1968 Summer Olympics
Swimmers at the 1972 Summer Olympics
Olympic swimmers of Japan
Asian Games medalists in swimming
Swimmers at the 1970 Asian Games
Swimmers at the 1974 Asian Games
Asian Games gold medalists for Japan
Asian Games silver medalists for Japan
Medalists at the 1970 Asian Games
Medalists at the 1974 Asian Games
20th-century Japanese women